This is a list of national conventions held by the Socialist Left Party. The national convention works as the highest decision making organ of the party, and is held every second year.

List of national conventions

References
General
The list of national conventions were taken from these sources:

(for the 12th)
(for the 13th)
Specific

Politics of Norway